Breakthrough Artist of the Year is an Aotearoa Music Award that honours New Zealand music artists for outstanding recordings. Artists who have previously been nominated for a New Zealand Music Award (excluding Critics' Choice Prize and technical awards) or has had a previous album reach the top 20 of the Official New Zealand Music Chart are ineligible. The award was first awarded in 1973 as Best New Artist.

Recipients

Best New Artist (1973-1976)

Most Promising (1978-2000)

Best New Act (2001-2002)

Breakthrough Artist of the Year (2003-current)

References

Breakthrough Artist of the Year
Awards established in 1973
Music awards for breakthrough artist